Jan Mycielski (born February 7, 1932 in Wiśniowa, Podkarpackie Voivodeship, Poland) is a Polish-American mathematician, a professor emeritus of mathematics at the University of Colorado at Boulder.

Academic career
His dissertation was entitled "Applications of Free Groups to Geometrical Constructions". Following positions at the Centre National de la Recherche Scientifique in Paris, the Institute of Mathematics of the Polish Academy of Sciences, the University of California, Berkeley, and Case Western Reserve University, he took a permanent faculty position at Colorado in 1969.

Contributions
Among the mathematical concepts named after Mycielski are:
The Ehrenfeucht–Mycielski sequence, a sequence of binary digits with pseudorandom properties
The Mycielskian, a construction for embedding any undirected graph into a larger graph with strictly higher chromatic number without creating any additional triangles.
The Mycielski–Grötzsch graph, the Mycielskian of the 5-cycle, an 11-vertex triangle-free graph that is the smallest possible triangle-free graph requiring four colors.
Mycielski's theorem that there exist triangle-free graphs with arbitrarily large chromatic number.

Awards and honors
In 2012 he became a fellow of the American Mathematical Society.

Selected works
 1991. A Note on S. M. Ulam's Mathematics. 
 A note in Adventures of a Mathematician. Stanislaw Ulam. University of California Press, 1991.

See also
 List of Poles

References

External links
 Mycielski's personal web page at the Univ. of Colorado.

1932 births
Living people
Polish set theorists
Polish logicians
University of Colorado Boulder faculty
Polish emigrants to the United States
University of Wrocław alumni
20th-century American mathematicians
21st-century American mathematicians
Fellows of the American Mathematical Society
Jan
20th-century Polish philosophers